William Newmarch (28 January 182023 March 1882) was an English banker, economist and statistician.

Life
Born at Thirsk, Yorkshire, Newmarch went to school in York; as a young man, he held posts as a clerk there. A clerk for a stamp distributor, he moved on to the Yorkshire Fire and Life Office, and then to the banking house Leatham, Few, and Co., in Wakefield (1843–1846). He then moved to London and worked for three financial institutions:

 the Agra Bank (1846–1851)
 secretary to the Globe Insurance Company (1851–1862)
 chief officer in the banking-house of Glyn, Mills & Co. (1862–1881)

Newmarch took an active part in the Royal Statistical Society, of which he was one of the honorary secretaries, editor of its journal, and President (1869–1871), and the Political Economy Club. He was also elected a fellow of the Royal Society.

Newmarch died at Torquay on 23 March 1882 and was buried at West Norwood Cemetery.

Works
In early life Newmarch published a Guide to York, undertook correspondence in the Sheffield Iris, and gave lectures. He contributed articles to magazines and newspapers. His knowledge of banking was displayed before the select parliamentary committee on the Bank Acts in 1857.

Newmarch collaborated with Thomas Tooke in the two final volumes of his History of Prices and was responsible for most of the work in them. For 19 years he wrote a survey of the commercial history of the year in The Economist.

Legacy
After Newmarch's death, friends founded a Newmarch Lectureship in economic science and statistics at University College London. Arthur Bowley, Josiah Stamp, Udny Yule, and Theodore Gregory were amongst the lecturers.

References

Obituaries 
"The Death of Mr. William Newmarch, F.R.S." Journal of the Statistical Society of London, Vol. 45, No. 1. (March 1882), pp. 115–121.
Obituary Notices of Fellows Deceased, Proceedings of the Royal Society of London, Vol. 34. (1882–1883), pp. xvii–xix.

Discussion 
There is a section on Newmarch in:
Paul J. FitzPatrick "Leading British Statisticians of the Nineteenth Century," Journal of the American Statistical Association, Vol. 55, No. 289. (March 1960), pp. 38–70. Reprinted in Studies in the History of Statistics and Probability II Edited by M G Kendall and R L Plackett, London 1977.

External links 
 
Royal Society citation

There is more information about Newmarch in the following AIM25 library record
 NEWMARCH, William (1820–1882): papers

Newmarch is placed among the classical economists in the opening (and sample) chapter of the following
D. P. O'Brien  The Classical Economists Revisited



1820 births
1882 deaths
People from Thirsk
English economists
English statisticians
Fellows of the Royal Society
Presidents of the Royal Statistical Society
Burials at West Norwood Cemetery
19th-century English mathematicians
19th-century British economists